Mamed Ibragimov (born June 9, 1992 in Pavlodar region, Kazakhstan) is a Kazakhstani freestyle wrestler (Azerbaijani origin).He competed in the men's freestyle 97 kg event at the 2016 Summer Olympics, in which he was eliminated in the quarterfinals by Elizbar Odikadze.
Mamed is 2014 Asian Games bronze medalist.

References

External links
 

1992 births
Living people
Kazakhstani male sport wrestlers
Olympic wrestlers of Kazakhstan
Wrestlers at the 2016 Summer Olympics
Asian Games bronze medalists for Kazakhstan
Wrestlers at the 2014 Asian Games
Asian Games medalists in wrestling
Medalists at the 2014 Asian Games
Asian Wrestling Championships medalists
People from Pavlodar
21st-century Kazakhstani people